James Joseph Esmond (October 8, 1889 in Albany, New York – June 26, 1948 in Troy, New York) was a professional baseball player who played shortstop in the Major Leagues from 1911 to 1915. He would play for the Cincinnati Reds, Indianapolis Hoosiers, and Newark Peppers.

See also
List of Major League Baseball annual triples leaders

External links

1889 births
1948 deaths
Major League Baseball shortstops
Baseball players from New York (state)
Cincinnati Reds players
Newark Peppers players
Indianapolis Hoosiers players
Gloversville-Johnstown Jags players
Elmira Colonels players
Jersey City Skeeters players
Montreal Royals players
Syracuse Stars (minor league baseball) players
Waterbury Brasscos players
Albany Senators players
Pittsfield Hillies players
Sportspeople from Albany, New York
Burials at St. Agnes Cemetery